Statistics of the Scottish Professional Football League in season 2014–15.

Scottish Premiership

Scottish Championship

Scottish League One

Scottish League Two

Award winners

See also
2014–15 in Scottish football

References

 
Scottish Professional Football League seasons